Kim Hyang-mi (born 19 September 1979) is a North Korean Olympic table tennis player.

She was able to compete in the 2004 Summer Olympics in Athens through the wildcard system, and surprised spectators by winning a silver medal in the women's singles, after being defeated in the final by China's Zhang Yining. Kim later married a University student, and thus retired.

References

External links

North Korean female table tennis players
Olympic table tennis players of North Korea
Table tennis players at the 2004 Summer Olympics
Table tennis players at the 1996 Summer Olympics
Olympic silver medalists for North Korea
Living people
Olympic medalists in table tennis
Medalists at the 2004 Summer Olympics
1979 births
Asian Games medalists in table tennis
Table tennis players at the 1998 Asian Games
Table tennis players at the 2002 Asian Games
Asian Games gold medalists for North Korea
Asian Games silver medalists for North Korea
Medalists at the 1998 Asian Games
Medalists at the 2002 Asian Games
21st-century North Korean women